Zeydar (also Romanized as Zaidar; also known as Zainalābād and Zeynalābād) is a village in Naharjan Rural District, Mud District, Sarbisheh County, South Khorasan Province, Iran. At the 2006 census, its population was 373, in 90 families.

References 

Populated places in Sarbisheh County